Thijs Vermeulen (born March 11, 1985) is a Dutch former basketball player. He was a long-time member of the DBL team Matrixx Magixx, which led to fans giving him the nickname "Mr. Magixx". Vermeulen played as shooting guard and was well known for his three point shooting qualities. After Magixx went bankrupt and left competition in 2014, he retired.

Vermeulen played in three games for the Netherlands men's national basketball team after making his debut on 5 September 2007 against Albania.

Honours
EiffelTowers Den Bosch
Dutch Basketball League (2): 2006, 2007

References

1985 births
Living people
Matrixx Magixx players
Dutch Basketball League players
Dutch men's basketball players
People from Rosmalen
Shooting guards
Sportspeople from North Brabant